Olga Nawoja Tokarczuk (born 29 January 1962) is a Polish writer, activist, and public intellectual. She is one of the most critically acclaimed and successful authors of her generation in Poland; in 2019, she was awarded the 2018 Nobel Prize in Literature as the first Polish female prose writer for "a narrative imagination that with encyclopedic passion represents the crossing of boundaries as a form of life". For her novel Flights, Tokarczuk has been awarded the 2018 Man Booker International Prize (translated by Jennifer Croft). Her works include Primeval and Other Times, Drive Your Plow Over the Bones of the Dead, and The Books of Jacob.

Tokarczuk is noted for the mythical tone of her writing. A clinical psychologist from the University of Warsaw, she has published a collection of poems, several novels, as well as other books with shorter prose works. For Flights and The Books of Jacob, she won the Nike Awards, Poland's top literary prize, among other accolades; she also won five times Nike audience award. In 2015, she received the German-Polish Bridge Prize for contribution in mutual understanding between European nations. Tokarczuk faced some backlash from nationalist groups in her homeland after the publication of The Books of Jacob, which is set in 18th-century Poland, because the novel celebrates the country’s cultural diversity.

Her works have been translated into almost 40 languages, making her one of the most translated contemporary Polish writers. The Books of Jacob, regarded as her magnum opus, was released in the UK in November 2021 after seven years of translation work, followed by release in the US in February 2022. In March, the novel was nominated for the 2022 Man Booker International Prize.

Biography

Early life, and education
Olga Tokarczuk was born in Sulechów near Zielona Góra, in western Poland. She is a daughter of two teachers, Wanda Słabowska and Józef Tokarczuk, and has a sister. Her parents were resettled from former Polish eastern regions after the Second World War; one of her grandmothers was of Ukrainian origin. The family lived in the countryside in Klenica, some 11 mi away from Zielona Góra, where her parents taught at the People's University and her father also ran a school library in which she found her love of literature. Her father was a member of the Polish United Workers' Party. As a child, Tokarczuk liked Henryk Sienkiewicz's popular novel In Desert and Wilderness and fairy tales, among others. Her family later moved south-east to Kietrz in Opolian Silesia, where she graduated from the C.K. Norwid High school. In 1979, she debuted with two short stories in prose published in youth scouting magazine Na Przełaj (No. 39, under the pseudonym Natasza Borodin).

Tokarczuk went on to study clinical psychology at the University of Warsaw in 1980, and during her studies she volunteered in an asylum for adolescents with behavioural problems. After graduation in 1985, she moved to Wrocław and later to Wałbrzych, where she worked as a psychotherapist in 1986–89 and teachers' trainer in 1989–96. In the meantime, she published poems and reviews in the press, and published a book of poetry in 1989. Her works were awarded at Walbrzych Literary Paths (1988, 1990). Tokarczuk quit to concentrate on literature, she also said she felt "more neurotic than [her] clients." She worked doing odd jobs in London for a while, improving her English, and went for literary scholarships in the United States (1996) and in Berlin (2001/02).

Inspiration, and family

Tokarczuk considers herself a disciple of Carl Jung and cites his psychology as an inspiration for her literary work.

Since 1998, she has lived between Krajanów and Wrocław, in Lower Silesia. Her home in Krajanów near Nowa Ruda is located in the Sudetes mountains at the multi-cultural Polish-Czech borderland. The locale has influenced her literary work; the novel House of Day, House of Night (1998) touches on life in the adopted home, and the action of Drive Your Plow Over the Bones of the Dead (2009) takes place in the picturesque Kłodzko Valley. In 1998, together with her first husband, Tokarczuk founded the Ruta publishing house, which operated until 2004. She was an organizer of the International Short Story Festival, which inaugurated in Wrocław in 2004. As a guest lecturer, she conducted prose workshops at universities in Kraków and Opole. Tokarczuk joined the editorial team of Krytyka Polityczna (Eng. ed. Political Critique), a magazine as well as large pan-regional network of institutions and activists, and currently serves on the Board of trustees of its academic and research unit – Institute for Advance Study in Warsaw. She also travelled around the world.

In 2009, Tokarczuk received a literary scholarship from the Netherlands Academy of Arts and Sciences, and during her stay at the NIAS campus in Wassenaar, she wrote her novel Drive Your Plow Over the Bones of the Dead, which was published the same year.

Roman Fingas, fellow psychologist, was Tokarczuk's first husband. They married when she was 23 and later divorced; their son Zbigniew was born in 1986. Grzegorz Zygadło is her second husband. She is a vegetarian.

Literary career
Olga Tokarczuk's first book was published in 1989, a collection of poems entitled Miasta w lustrach (Cities in Mirrors). Her debut novel, Podróż ludzi księgi (The Journey of the Book-People), was published in 1993. A parable on two lovers' quest for the "secret of the Book" – a metaphor for the meaning of life – is set in 17th century, and portrays an expedition to a monastery in the Pyrenees on the trail of a book which reveals the mystery of life, ending with an ironic twist. It was well received by critics, and won Polish Publisher’s Prize for best debut. Ever since then, Tokarczuk’s novels and short stories have ranked her amongst the top of Polish contemporary writers of prose.

The follow-up novel E.E. (1995) plays with the conventions of the modernist psychological novel, and took its title from the initials of its protagonist, the adolescent Erna Eltzner, who develops psychic abilities. Growing up in a wealthy German-Polish family in the 1920s in Wrocław, which was at that time a German city named Breslau, she allegedly becomes a medium, a fact her mother begins to take advantage of by organizing spiritual sessions. Tokarczuk introduces the characters of scientists, the psychiatrist-patient relationship, and despite elements of spiritualism, occultism as well as gnosticism, she represents psychological realism and cognitive scepticism. Katarzyna Kantner, a literary scholar who defended her PhD thesis on the works of Olga Tokarczuk, points to C. G. Jung’s doctoral dissertation "On the Psychology and Pathology of So-Called Occult Phenomena" as an inspiration.

Her third novel, Primeval and Other Times (Prawiek i inne czasy, Eng. 2010), was published in 1996 and became highly successful. It is set in the fictitious village of Primeval at the very heart of Poland, which is populated by some eccentric, archetypical characters. The village, a microcosm of Europe, is guarded by four archangels, from whose perspective the book chronicles the lives of its inhabitants over a period of eight decades, beginning in the year that World War I broke out. The book presents the creation of a myth emerging before the reader’s eyes. "This is Primeval: an enclosed snow globe, a world in itself, which it may or may not be possible to ever leave. [...] And yet, as much as the town of Primeval is devastated, over and over, by history, there is also a counter dream, full of creaturely magic and wonder." Translated into many languages, with English version by Antonia Lloyd-Jones, Primeval and Other Times established Tokarczuk's international reputation as one of the most important representatives of Polish literature in her generation.

After Primeval and Other Times, her work began drifting away from the novel genre towards shorter prose texts and essays. Tokarczuk's next book Szafa (The Wardrobe, 1997) was a collection of three novella-type stories.

House of Day, House of Night (Dom dzienny, dom nocny, 1998, Eng. 2003), is what Tokarczuk terms the ’constellation novel’, a patchwork of loosely connected disparate stories, sketches, and essays about life past and present in the author's adopted home in Krajanów, which allow various interpretations and enable communication at a deeper, psychological level. Her goal is to make those images, fragments of narrative and motif, merge together only on entering the reader’s consciousness. While some, at least those unfamiliar with Central European history, have labeled it Tokarczuk's most "difficult" piece, it was her first book to be published in English, and was shortlisted for the International Dublin Literary Award in 2004.

House of Day, House of Night was followed by a collection of short stories Gra na wielu bębenkach (Playing on Many Drums, 2001) as well as a book-length non-fiction essay Lalka i perła (The Doll and the Pearl, 2000), on the subject of Bolesław Prus' classic novel The Doll. She also published a volume with three modern Christmas tales, together with her fellow writers Jerzy Pilch and Andrzej Stasiuk (Opowieści wigilijne, 2000). Ostatnie historie (The Last Stories) of 2004 is an exploration of death from the perspectives of three generations, while the novel Anna in the Tombs of the World (2006) was a contribution to the Canongate Myth Series by Polish publisher Znak.

Tokarczuk's novel Flights (Bieguni, 2007, Eng. 2018) returns to the patchwork approach of essay and fiction, the major theme of which is modern day nomads. The book explores how a person moves through time and space as well as psychology of travelling. For Flights she has been awarded both the jury and the readers prize of Polish Nike Awards in 2008, and then the 2018 Man Booker International Prize (translation by Jennifer Croft). The novel landed on the short list for the U.S. prestigious National Book Award in the "Translated Literature" category; a panel of judges stated:

In 2009 she published an existential, noir thriller novel Drive Your Plow Over the Bones of the Dead (Prowadź swój pług przez kości umarłych, Eng. 2019), which is not a conventional crime story, transforming into an acid social satire. The main character and narrator is Janina Duszejko, a woman in her 60s living in a rural area at the Polish Kłodzko Valley, eccentric in perception of other humans through astrology and fond of the poetry of William Blake, from whose work the title of the book is taken. She decides to investigate the murders of members of the local hunting club, and initially explains these deaths as having been caused by wild animals taking revenge on hunters. The novel became a bestseller in Poland. It was the basis of the crime film Spoor (2017) directed by Agnieszka Holland, which won the Alfred Bauer Prize (Silver Bear) at the 67th Berlin International Film Festival. The English translation by Antonia Lloyd-Jones earned Tokarczuk a second nomination for the Man Booker International Prize.

An epic novel The Books of Jacob (2014, English translation 2021 by Jennifer Croft) is a journey over seven borders, five languages, and three major religions. Beginning in 1752 at the historical eastern Galicia region, now western Ukraine, it revolves around a controversial 18th-century Polish-Jewish religious leader and mystic Jacob Frank among other historical figures, and winds up near mid-20th-century Korolówka, Poland, where a family of local Jews had hidden from the Holocaust. Frank, who founded the Frankist sect fighting for the rights and emancipation of the Jews, encouraged his followers to transgress moral boundaries, even promoting orgiastic rites. The Frankists were persecuted in the Jewish community, especially after Frank led his followers to be baptised by the Roman Catholic church. The church later imprisoned him for heresy for more than a decade, only for Frank to declare that he was the messiah. Through third-person accounts, the action takes place also in present-day Turkey, Greece, Austria and Germany, capturing regional spirit, climate as well as interesting customs. Jan Michalski Prize jury praised:

In regard to the historical and ideological divides of Polish literature, the book has been characterized as anti-Sienkiewicz. It was soon acclaimed by critics and readers alike, but its reception has been hostile in some Polish nationalist circles and Olga Tokarczuk became a target of some internet hate and harassment campaign.

Literary Heights Festival

Since its foundation in 2015, Olga Tokarczuk has become co-host of the annual Literary Heights Festival, which has included events in her village. The festival has a rich programme of cultural events such as educational sessions and workshops, debates, concerts, film screenings as well as various exhibitions.

Olga Tokarczuk Foundation
In November 2019, Tokarczuk has established a foundation with a planned wide range of activities related to literature to create progressive intellectual and artistic centre. It was declared that Polish poet Tymoteusz Karpowicz's villa in Wrocław would become its future seat. The writer allocated 10% of her Nobel financial prize to the body and, aside from her, Agnieszka Holland and Ireneusz Grin have joined the Foundation Council. The foundation has started its operations in October 2020 implementing educational programs, organizing writing contests and public debates, funding scholarships for young aspiring writers as well as, also international, residencies.

Views
Tokarczuk is a leftist, an atheist, and a feminist. She has been criticized by some nationalist groups in Poland as unpatriotic, anti-Christian and a promoter of eco-terrorism. She has denied the allegations, has described herself as a "true patriot" and said that groups criticizing her are xenophobic and damage Poland's international reputation.

In 2015, after the publication of The Books of Jacob, Tokarczuk was criticized by the Nowa Ruda Patriots association, who demanded that the town's council revoke the writer's honorary citizenship of Nowa Ruda because, as the association claimed, she had tarnished the good name of the Polish nation. Those people's postulate was supported by Senator Waldemar Bonkowski of the Law and Justice Party, according to whom Tokarczuk's literary output and public statements are in "absolute contradiction to the assumptions of the Polish historical politics". Tokarczuk asserted that she is the true patriot, not the people and groups who criticize her, and whose alleged xenophobic and racist attitudes and actions are harmful to Poland and its image abroad.

In 2020, she was one of the signatories alongside other prominent writers such as Margaret Atwood, John Banville and John Maxwell Coetzee of an open letter addressed to the President of the European Commission, Ursula von der Leyen, urging the European Union "to take immediate steps to defend core European values – equality, non-discrimination, respect for minorities – which are being blatantly violated in Poland" and appealing to the Polish government to stop targeting sexual minorities and to withdraw support from organizations promoting homophobia.

Awards and recognition
Olga Tokarczuk is the laureate of numerous literary awards both in and outside Poland. Her works have become the subject of several dozen academic papers and theses.

Her first recognition, in 2004, was for the English translation (by Antonia Lloyd-Jones) of her 1998 novel House of Day, House of Night, which was shortlisted for the International Dublin Literary Award.

Tokarczuk has been twice awarded Nike Award, the most important Polish literary accolade – for Flights in 2008, and The Books of Jacob in 2015. She won the Nike Readers' Choice Award five times, Primeval & Other Times being the award's first recipient ever.

In 2010, Tokarczuk received the Silver Medal for Merit to Culture – Gloria Artis. In 2013, she was awarded the Slovene Vilenica Prize.

She is the recipient of the 2015 Brückepreis, the 20th edition of the award granted by the "Europa-City Zgorzelec/Görlitz". The prize is a joint undertaking of the German and Polish border twin cities aimed at advancing mutual, regional and European peace, understanding and cooperation among people of different nationalities, cultures and viewpoints. Particularly appreciated by the jury was Tokarczuk's creation of literary bridges connecting people, generations and cultures, especially residents of the border territories of Poland, Germany and the Czech Republic, who have had often different existential and historical experiences. Also stressed was Tokarczuk's "rediscovery" and elucidation of the complex multinational and multicultural past of the Lower Silesia region, an area of great political conflicts. Attending the award ceremony in Görlitz, Tokarczuk was impressed by the positive and pragmatic attitude demonstrated by the mayor of the German town in regard to the current refugee and migrant crisis, which she contrasted with the ideological uproar surrounding the issue in Poland.

For The Books of Jacob, Tokarczuk was awarded the 2016 Kulturhuset Stadsteatern International Literary Prize in Stockholm. The French translation of the novel was recognized as the 2018 "Best European novel" by France's cultural magazine Transfuge. It also won the 2018 Swiss Jan Michalski Prize, and the 2019 French Prix Laure Bataillon for the best foreign-language book translated in the previous year.

In 2018, Flights (English translation by Jennifer Croft) was awarded the Man Booker International Prize.

A year later, Drive Your Plow Over the Bones of the Dead (translation by Antonia Lloyd-Jones) was shortlisted for the 2019 Man Booker International Prize.

Olga Tokarczuk was awarded the 2018 Nobel Prize for Literature in 2019 for "a narrative imagination that with encyclopedic passion represents the crossing of boundaries as a form of life" and delivered the Nobel Lecture, The Tender Narrator, on 7 December of that year. The 2018 award had been postponed due to controversy within the Nobel committee.

In 2020, she received the title of an Honorary Citizen of Warsaw as a recognition of her literary achievements.

In 2021, Tokarczuk received the titles of a Doctor Honoris Causa from the University of Warsaw, University of Wrocław, and then from the Kraków's Jagiellonian University. She also became Honorary Citizen of Kraków, which was the second, or maybe even the first, Poland's official capital.

She was elected a Royal Society of Literature International Writer in November 2021.

In March 2022, The Books of Jacob (translated by Jennifer Croft) was longlisted for the 2022 Man Booker International Prize, subsequently being shortlisted in April.

Publications

English translations
 House of Day, House of Night. Translated by Antonia Lloyd-Jones. Evanston, IL: Northwestern UP, 2003. .
 Primeval & Other Times. Translated by Antonia Lloyd-Jones. Prague: Twisted Spoon Press, 2010. .
 Flights. Translated by Jennifer Croft. New York: Penguin, 2018. .
 Drive Your Plow Over the Bones of the Dead. Translated by Antonia Lloyd-Jones. New York: Penguin Random House/Riverhead Books, 2019. .
 The Lost Soul. Illustrated by Joanna Concejo. Translated by Antonia Lloyd-Jones. New York: Seven Stories Press, 2021. .
 The Books of Jacob. Translated by Jennifer Croft. New York: Penguin, 2021. .

Bibliography
Novels
 
 
 
  Translated by Antonia Lloyd-Jones. Granta, . Northwestern University Press. .

Short story collections
 

Poetry

Nonfiction

Opowieści wigilijne (Christmas Tales, in Polish). With Jerzy Pilch and Andrzej Stasiuk. Wałbrzych: Czarna Ruta, 2000. .

Czuły narrator [The Tender Narrator] (in Polish). Kraków: Wydawnictwo Literackie, 2020. .
Children's

See also
 List of Polish Nobel laureates
 Polish literature
 List of Poles: Literature

References

Further reading
Ruth Franklin, "Past Master: An experimental novelist and the battle for Poland's national narrative", The New Yorker, 5 & 12 August 2019, pp. 20–26. "Her role, as she sees it, is to force her readers to examine aspects of history – their own or their nation's – that they would rather avoid. She has become, she says, a 'psychotherapist of the past.'" (p. 26.)

External links

  including the Nobel Lecture on 7 December 2019 The Tender Narrator
 Nobel Prize-Winner Olga Tokarczuk in Conversation with John Freeman on Literary Hub, 10 October 2019
 Olga Tokarczuk at The Guardian
 Biography at Culture.pl (Polish Adam Mickiewicz Institute, May 2018)

 Short biography, interviews, and reviews at PolishWriting.net, 
 
 
 List of Works at Swiss Nobel Laureates' catalogue
 Olga Tokarczuk at Fitzcarraldo Editions
 Olga Tokarczuk at Twisted Spoon Press

 
1962 births
Living people
20th-century Polish novelists
20th-century Polish poets
20th-century Polish women writers
21st-century Polish novelists
21st-century Polish poets
21st-century Polish women writers
The Greens (Poland) politicians
International Booker Prize winners
Magic realism writers
The New Yorker people
Nike Award winners
Nobel laureates in Literature
People from Sulechów
Polish Nobel laureates
Polish atheists
Polish people of Ukrainian descent
Polish psychologists
Polish screenwriters
Polish women novelists
Polish women poets
Polish women psychologists
Polish women screenwriters
Recipients of the Silver Medal for Merit to Culture – Gloria Artis
Women Nobel laureates